The Busyconinae are  taxonomic subfamily of large sea snails, often known as whelks. The name "whelk" also refers to Buccinidae. Busyconinae consists of Recent and fossil species.

Genera
  † Brachysycon Petuch, 1994
 Busycoarctum Hollister, 1958
 Busycon Röding, 1798
 Tribe Busyconini Wade, 1917
 Tribe Busycotypini Petuch, 1994
  † Coronafulgur Petuch, 2004
  † Laevisycon Petuch, R.F. Myers & Berschauer, 2015 
 Lindafulgur Petuch, 2004
  † Pyruella Petuch, 1982 
 Sinistrofulgur Hollister, 1958
  † Spinifulgur Petuch, 1994
  † Sycofulgur Marks, 1950 
  † Sycopsis Conrad, 1867
  † Turrifulgur Petuch, 1988 
Genera brought into synonymy
 Fulgur Montfort, 1810: synonym of Busycon Röding, 1798

References

 Petuch E.J., Myers R.F. & Berschauer D.P. (2015). The living and fossil Busycon whelks: Iconic mollusks of eastern North America. San Diego Shell Club. viii + 195 pp.
 Bouchet P., Rocroi J.P., Hausdorf B., Kaim A., Kano Y., Nützel A., Parkhaev P., Schrödl M. & Strong E.E. (2017). Revised classification, nomenclator and typification of gastropod and monoplacophoran families. Malacologia. 61(1-2): 1-526

External links